Charles Sampson (born 24 November 1980) is a Ghanaian international footballer, who currently plays for IFK Luleå.

Club career
Sampson moved to Greece in July 1997, initially joining Greek first division side Kalamata F.C. for one season. He spent the following season in the Greek second division with Apollon Kalamarias F.C., and then returned to Kalamata for two more seasons. He moved to OFI Crete for the following season, but only appeared in three league matches, for a total of 40 Greek top flight matches during his career.

Sampson would later play in the lower divisions for Panegialios F.C. and Fostiras F.C., before returning to Kalamata for the 2003–04 Greek second division season.

Sampson joined Swedish side Assyriska Föreningen in 2004. He would help the club earn promotion to the Allsvenskan and play in the league the following season. Assyriska loaned Sampson to Bodens BK for the 2008 season, and he would later join Boden on a permanent transfer in 2010.

International career
Sampson made six appearances for the Ghana national football team.

References

External links
Profile at Ghanaweb

1980 births
Living people
Ghanaian footballers
Ghana international footballers
Ghanaian expatriate footballers
Super League Greece players
Allsvenskan players
Ettan Fotboll players
Kalamata F.C. players
Apollon Pontou FC players
OFI Crete F.C. players
Assyriska FF players
Bodens BK players
IFK Luleå players
Panegialios F.C. players
Expatriate footballers in Greece
Expatriate footballers in Sweden
Association football midfielders
Ghapoha Readers players